"Roll On" is a song by Australian punk rock band The Living End. It was released on 22 January 2001, as the second single from the band's album of the same name. The track's title is based on the 1998 Australian waterfront dispute.

The song reached number 15 in the ARIA Charts and was used in National Lampoon's Van Wilder, as well as promotional advertisements for ESPN's X-Games. It was also used by professional wrestler Nigel McGuinness as his entrance music.

Track listing
"Roll On"
"Pictures in the Mirror" (live)
"Sunday Bloody Sunday" (U2)
"I've Just Seen a Face" (The Beatles)
"Homestead" (demo)

2000 singles
The Living End songs
2000 songs
EMI Records singles
Song recordings produced by Nick Launay
Songs about Australia